Associação Recreativa de Freixieiro is a professional futsal team based in Matosinhos, Portugal. It plays in the II Divisão Futsal.

Honours
International
Futsal European Clubs Championship:
Runner-up (1): 1990–91
European Futsal Cup Winners Cup:
Runner-up (1): 2003–04

National
Liga Portuguesa de Futsal:
Winner (1): 2001–02
Taça de Portugal de Futsal:
Runner-up (2): 1999–2000, 2002–03
SuperTaça de Futsal de Portugal:
Winner (1): 2002
Runner-up (1): 2003

External links
Official website
Zerozero

Futsal clubs in Portugal
Sport in Matosinhos